Walter Charles "Wally" Kilrea Jr. is an American retired ice hockey forward who was the first All-American for Yale.

Career
The son of NHLer Wally Kilrea, Wally Jr. grew up around hockey and when his time came to choose his junior path, Kilrea the younger chose to head to college. He joined Yale's varsity team in 1951, after a year on the freshman team, and provided a spark to the Bulldog's offense. He led the Bulldogs in scoring as a sophomore and helped the team reach the NCAA Tournament for the first time in 1952. The team finished in 3rd place after losing a nail-biter against Colorado College in the semifinal and Kilrea made the All-Tournament Second Team.

Kilrea continued to play well for Yale, leading the team in scoring each of his three seasons with the team. He was named team captain for his senior season and scored a then-program record 28 assists. Kilrea finished with a new program record of 115 points and was the first Bulldog to hit the century mark (assists were not an official stat prior to 1934). For his tremendous season, Kilrea was named as an AHCA First Team All-American in 1954.

Statistics

Regular season and playoffs

Awards and honors

References

External links

Year of birth missing (living people)
Living people
American ice hockey forwards
Ice hockey players from Pennsylvania
People from Hershey, Pennsylvania
Yale Bulldogs men's ice hockey players
AHCA Division I men's ice hockey All-Americans